Nathan Fuakala (born 13 March 2001) is a French professional footballer who plays as a defender for Belgian club Francs Borains on loan from Deinze.

Club career
Born in Roubaix, Fuakala made his debut for Club NXT, the reserve team for Club Brugge, in the Belgian First Division B on 22 August 2020 against RWDM47. He started and played the whole match as the match ended in a 0–2 defeat.

On 21 May 2021, he signed a two-year contract with Deinze, also in the Belgian second tier. On 5 September 2022, Fuakala was loaned by Francs Borains.

Personal life
Born in France, Fuakala is of Congolese descent.

Career statistics

References

External links
 Profile at the French Football Federation website.

2001 births
Black French sportspeople
French sportspeople of Republic of the Congo descent
Sportspeople from Roubaix
Footballers from Hauts-de-France
Living people
French footballers
Association football midfielders
Club NXT players
K.M.S.K. Deinze players
Francs Borains players
Challenger Pro League players
Belgian National Division 1 players
French expatriate footballers
French expatriate sportspeople in Belgium
Expatriate footballers in Belgium